Nonso is a Nigerian male given name. Notable people with the name include:

 Nonso Amadi (born 1995), Nigerian singer, songwriter, and music producer
 Nonso Anozie (born 1979), British actor
 Nonso Diobi (born 1976), Nigerian actor and director

African masculine given names